Qabaleh-ye Firuzi (also Romanized as Qabāleh-ye Fīrūzī and Qabālehfīrūzī) is a village in Banesh Rural District, Beyza District, Sepidan County, Fars Province, Iran. At the 2006 census, its population was 153, in 38 families.

References 

Populated places in Beyza County